Robert Navarro may refer to:

 Robert Navarro (politician) (born 1952), French politician
 Robert Navarro (footballer) (born 2002), Spanish footballer

See also-
 Roberto Navarro (born 1988), boxer from the Dominican Republic
 Roberto Navarro (journalist) (born 1959), Argentine journalist